The Queen Victoria Museum and Art Gallery (QVMAG) is a museum located in Launceston, Tasmania, Australia. The QVMAG is the largest museum in Australia not located in a capital city.

History 
The foundation stone for the original building to house the Victoria Museum and Art Gallery was laid by the Mayor of Launceston, Robert Carter, on 21 June 1887. Alexander Morton, of the museum in Hobart, acted as honorary curator from its opening in 1891 until 1896, with Herbert Hedley Scott assuming the role of curator in May 1897. In 1926 the Launceston City Council amended the name to Queen Victoria Museum and Art Gallery to avoid confusion with the state of Victoria. Scott died in 1938 and was succeeded as director by his son, Eric Oswald Gale Scott later that year.

Collection and locations
Established in 1891, the Queen Victoria Museum and Art Gallery has a strong reputation for its collection which includes fine exhibitions of colonial art, contemporary craft and design, Tasmanian history and natural sciences, specifically a zoology collection. There is also a special exhibition of a full Chinese temple that was used by 19th-century Chinese tin miners, a working planetarium, and displays related to Launceston's industrial environment and railway workshops.

The museum also houses the Victoria Cross awarded to Lewis McGee.

The Queen Victoria Museum and Art Gallery is located on two sites, at Royal Park and at Inveresk, the site of the old Launceston Railway Workshops

Publications
As part of its work, the QVMAG has published several journals relating to Tasmanian ecology and history.  These include Records of the Queen Victoria Museum and Art Gallery, Occasional Papers of the Queen Victoria Museum and Art Gallery, Technical Reports of the Queen Victoria Museum and Art Gallery.

See also

 List of art museums and galleries in Australia

References

External links
Queen Victoria Museum and Art Gallery website

Museums in Tasmania
Museums established in 1891
Natural history museums in Australia
Art museums and galleries in Tasmania
Planetaria in Australia
Buildings and structures in Launceston, Tasmania
1891 establishments in Australia
Railway museums in Tasmania
Tasmanian Heritage Register